I'll Never Be Lonely is a song written by Mary Tarver in 1958 and published by Ted Music, BMI. It was first recorded by Gene Summers and His Rebels in 1958 and issued by Jan/Jane Records that same year. "I'll Never Be Lonely" was recorded at Master Recorders in Los Angeles, California in 1958 during the "School of Rock 'n Roll"/"Straight Skirt" sessions. Musicians featured were the original Rebels: Gene Summers on vocals and guitar, James McClung on lead guitar, Gary Moon on drums, and Benny Williams on slap bass. The flipside of "I'll Never Be Lonely" was "Twixteen".

Reviews
BILLBOARD MAGAZINE - January 26, 1959 Reviews of New Pop Records, page 48
GENE SUMMERS
I'll Never Be Lonely ***
JANE 106 - Gene Summers sells this rockaballad with warmth, helped by a chorus and a big beat from the combo. It's in the current groove and has a chance. (Ted, BMI)

References

Gene Summers discography from Rocky Productions, France
Gene Summers discography from Wangdangdula Finland
Gene Summers session data from Tapio's Fin-A-Billy, Finland

Sources
Billboard (magazine) - January 26, 1959 Reviews of New Pop Records, page 48 United States
Liner notes "The Ultimate School Of Rock & Roll" 1997 United States
"Cover Versions Of The Songs Made Famous By Gene Summers" 2007  United States
Article and sessionography in issue 15 (1977) of New Kommotion Magazine UK
Article and sessionography in issue 23 (1980) of New Kommotion Magazine UK
Feature article and sessionography in issue 74 (1999) of Rockin' Fifties Magazine Germany
Feature article with photo spread in issue 53 (2000) of Bill Griggs' Rockin' 50s Magazine United States
Feature Article with photo spread in issue 54 (2000) of Bill Griggs' Rockin' 50s Magazine United States

See also

Rockin' Country Style

1958 singles
1958 songs
Songs written by Mary Tarver
American rock songs
Rock ballads
Gene Summers songs